Maja Užmah (born 23 February 1988) is a Slovenian handball player for HBC Celles-sur-Belle and the Slovenian national team.

She participated at the 2016 European Women's Handball Championship.

At the first Four-a-Side Wheelchair Handball World Championship which was held in 2022 she was listed as team official and head of delegation for the Slovenian team.

References

1988 births
Living people
Slovenian female handball players
Sportspeople from Pula
Expatriate handball players
Slovenian expatriate sportspeople in Croatia
Slovenian expatriate sportspeople in France